Ivko Ganchev Ivanov (born 21 July 1965 in Stara Zagora) is a former Bulgarian football goalkeeper. He ended his career at the end of 1999–2000 season. He started his manager career with his home town club Beroe Stara Zagora.

Career
On the club level, Ganchev has played for Beroe Stara Zagora (1984–1989), Slavia Sofia (1989–1991), Bursaspor (1991–1999) and Çaykur Rizespor (1999–2000). For Bulgaria, he has been capped 3 times. Now he is the coach of Beroe Stara Zagora after being appointed in July 2012. He was formerly employed as assistant coach of Bursaspor.

Honours
 Beroe
 A Group: 1985–86

Individual
Toulon Tournament Best Goalkeeper: 1986

References

External links

1965 births
Living people
Sportspeople from Stara Zagora
Bulgarian footballers
Bulgaria international footballers
Bulgarian expatriate footballers
Association football goalkeepers
PFC Beroe Stara Zagora players
PFC Slavia Sofia players
Bursaspor footballers
Çaykur Rizespor footballers
Expatriate footballers in Turkey
Bulgarian expatriate sportspeople in Turkey
First Professional Football League (Bulgaria) players
Süper Lig players
Bulgarian football managers
PFC Beroe Stara Zagora managers